Patrick Farnan (born 1936) is an Irish retired Gaelic footballer who played for club side St. Vincent's and at inter-county level with the Dublin senior football team.

Career

Farnan was a product of St. Joseph's CBS and won All-Ireland medals as a dual player in 1954 as the Dublin minor teams completed the double after defeats of Tipperary and Kerry. His development at club level with St. Vincent's saw him drafted onto the Dublin junior team in 1958, however, he was subsequently promoted to the senior team and enjoyed a successful season by claiming National League and Leinster Championship titles. Farnan's lined out at right corner-forward for Dublin's 1958 All-Ireland final defeat of Derry. He ended his career by winning a second provincial title.

Honours

Dublin
All-Ireland Senior Football Championship: 1958
Leinster Senior Football Championship: 1958, 1959
National Football League: 1957-58
All-Ireland Minor Football Championship: 1954
Leinster Minor Football Championship: 1954
All-Ireland Minor Hurling Championship: 1954
Leinster Minor Hurling Championship: 1954

References

1936 births
Living people
St Vincents (Dublin) Gaelic footballers
St Vincents (Dublin) hurlers
Dublin inter-county Gaelic footballers
Dublin inter-county hurlers